Ibiyemi Samuel Tunji (born 2 January 1954, died 9th of September 2021) was a Nigerian 
academic, lecturer, Professor of Electrical & Electronics Engineering. He is the second Vice-Chancellor of the Achievers University, Owo Ondo State. He was appointed on 1 April 2014 to succeed Professor Johnson Odebiyi, the pioneer Vice-chancellor, whose tenure started in 2008 and ended in 2014.

Early life and education 
He obtained Council of Engineering Institution, CEI (UK) Part II (equivalent to bachelor's degree in the UK) in Electronics Engineering from Cambridge Institute of Technology, Cambridge, Uk; Master of Science (1980) and Ph.D. (1982) degrees in Electrical Engineering (Computer & Control) from University of Bradford, Bradford, England. He has also served as the longest head of department at the University of Ilorin, Electrical and Electronics Engineering department.

Prior to his appointment in 2014, he has also worked in various academic and administrative positions, such as Dean/Provost, College of Science & Technology, Covenant University, Ota (March 2002 – July 2005); and Head of Department, University of Ilorin, Ilorin (Up to 12 years).

Achievements and contributions 
As the Vice-Chancellor of the Institution, he introduced Engineering courses to the institution in the 2016/2017 academic session, which was not in the institution before then.

In February 2020, Ibiyemi handed over six undergraduates to the law enforcement agency for their involvement in Cult activities.

Ibiyemi also called on the federal government to declare a state of emergency in the education sector, stated that many admission seekers were not willing to attend private universities, he also appealed to the Federal Government to make private universities attractive to admission seekers.

In 2019, he also requested that Private Universities should be included in the TETFund scheme, stating that the non-inclusion of private universities as beneficiaries of TETFund was unfair.

References

1954 births
Living people
Vice-Chancellors of Nigerian universities
People from Kogi State
Alumni of the University of Bradford
Academic staff of the University of Ilorin
Academic staff of Covenant University
Nigerian electronic engineers